Christopher "Opes" Anderson (born 2 May 1952) is an Australian former professional rugby league footballer who played in the 1970s and 1980s, and coached in the 1990s and 2000s. An Australian Kangaroos and New South Wales Blues representative winger, he featured in Canterbury-Bankstown's third grand final win and captained Halifax (Heritage № 941) to both League and Cup success.

As a coach, Anderson took Australia to World Cup victory and coached both Canterbury-Bankstown and Melbourne Storm to premiership wins. He is also a member of the Halifax Hall of Fame.

Playing career
Anderson was a  who was recruited by Peter Moore from Forbes, New South Wales, where he attended Red Bend Catholic College. As a flankman for the Canterbury side, Anderson gave the club a vital tryscoring power which had been quite absent from Belmore throughout the 1950s and 1960s. In 1974, when Canterbury-Bankstown reached the Grand Final, Anderson broke Morrie Murphy's 1947 record of sixteen tries for the club.

He also played in England for Widnes. Anderson played left wing in Widnes' 2–3 defeat by Bradford Northern in the 1974–75 Player's No.6 Trophy Final during the 1974–75 season at Wilderspool Stadium, Warrington on Saturday 25 January 1975. Also during the 1974–75 Northern Rugby Football League season he was flown to England to play on the wing for Widnes in their 14–7 victory over Warrington in the 1975 Challenge Cup Final at Wembley Stadium, London on Saturday 10 May 1975.

Anderson surpassed Eddie Burns' club record for Canterbury-Bankstown of 65 tries in 1978.

Anderson represented Australia in eight tests, including the 1975 World Cup and two Kangaroos Tours in 1978 and 1982. He also represented New South Wales in the experimental 1980 State of Origin game. In the third Origin encounter of 1983 (his last representative match), Anderson became the first ever player to score a hat-trick of tries in a State of Origin match, although the Blues lost 22–43. That season Anderson scored nineteen tries for the Bulldogs, a club record until Nigel Vagana scored twenty-three in 2002.

After struggling with a broken arm during 1984, and being dropped to reserve grade for the latter part of the NSWRL season, Anderson became captain-coach of Halifax between late 1984 and May 1988 where he enjoyed great success, including winning the Championship during the 1985–86 season, and played  in the 19-18 victory over St. Helens in the 1987 Challenge Cup Final during the 1986–87 season at Wembley Stadium, London on Saturday 2 May 1987. He played stand-off in almost all his games for Halifax.

Coaching career
Anderson is one of the few people to play and coach competition winning sides in both Australia and England. He is also one of the few people to coach two different clubs to NRL/NSWRL Premiership success. Anderson returned to Australia after playing/coaching in the British 1987–88 season and was appointed coach of the Canterbury-Bankstown Bulldogs Under 21s team for the 1989 season.

Anderson was quickly appointed as Canterbury's first grade coach for 1990 and enjoyed eight fruitful seasons at Canterbury, including the 1995 Premiership triumph over the Manly-Warringah Sea Eagles.

The formation of the Melbourne Storm saw Anderson become their first coach. His son, Ben, played 17 games for Melbourne. Anderson was appointed coach of the Australian national team in March 1999, replacing Wayne Bennett. Then he guided the Storm to Premiership success when they defeated the St. George Illawarra Dragons in the 1999 NRL Grand Final. Anderson was coach of the Australian team to compete in the end of season 1999 Rugby League Tri-Nations tournament. In the final against New Zealand the Kangaroos won 22–20.

After seven rounds (and only two wins) of the 2001 NRL season Anderson quit as Melbourne Storm coach. On the 2001 Kangaroo Tour, when coaching Australia, Anderson, was taken to a Wigan hospital after complaining of chest pains during the first half of the deciding third test match against Great Britain at the JJB Stadium. He had suffered a non-fatal myocardial infarction but made a full recovery.

Anderson was appointed coach of the Cronulla-Sutherland Sharks for two controversial seasons in 2002 and 2003, getting them one game short of the Grand Final in 2002. Anderson was sacked in dramatic circumstances over disagreements with the club's management on the future direction of the team, largely centred on his decision to replace the existing , Preston Campbell with new signing Brett Kimmorley in the starting side. He also continually picked his son, Jarrad, at the expense of Matt King, who ended up moving to the Melbourne Storm where his career blossomed. At the end of the 2003 NRL season, he went on the 2003 Kangaroo tour of Great Britain and France, coaching Australia to victory over Great Britain in what would be the last time the two nations contested an Ashes series. After five successful seasons Anderson's tenure as coach of Australia came to a halt following the successful 2003 whitewash of Great Britain.

In July 2004 Anderson was appointed coach of the Newport Gwent Dragons – a Welsh rugby union team. Despite finishing fourth in the Celtic League that season, his one-year contract was not renewed.

Anderson accepted a two-year contract with the Sydney Roosters as their first grade coach for the 2007 and 2008 NRL seasons. However Anderson stepped down from the job late into the 2007 season, after just five wins from sixteen matches – including a horrific 56-0 loss to Manly-Warringah Sea Eagles. He was replaced by former Sydney Roosters  Brad Fittler.

Recognition
Anderson is a Halifax Hall of Fame Inductee and was awarded the Australian Sports Medal on 24 October 2000 for his contribution to Australian rugby league.

References

External links
Player Details at stateoforigin.com.au
Bulldogs profile

 

1953 births
Living people
Australia national rugby league team coaches
Australia national rugby league team players
Australian rugby league coaches
Australian rugby league players
Australian expatriate sportspeople in England
Canterbury-Bankstown Bulldogs coaches
Canterbury-Bankstown Bulldogs players
Cronulla-Sutherland Sharks coaches
Dragons RFC coaches
Halifax R.L.F.C. captains
Halifax R.L.F.C. coaches
Halifax R.L.F.C. players
Hull Kingston Rovers players
Melbourne Storm coaches
New South Wales Rugby League State of Origin players
Recipients of the Australian Sports Medal
Rugby league wingers
Sydney Roosters coaches
Widnes Vikings players